The 7th Road to Le Mans Cup is an automobile endurance event that took place on 9 and 11 June 2022, at the Circuit de la Sarthe, Le Mans, France. The race features LMP3 and GT3 category cars competing in their respective classes.

Entry list

Reserve entries
	
In addition to the fifty entries given invitations for the race, nine entries were put on a reserve list to potentially replace any invitations that were not accepted or withdrawn. Reserve entries are ordered with the first reserve replacing the first withdrawal from the race, regardless of the class of either entry.

Qualifying
Provisional pole positions in each class are denoted in bold.

Race 1

Race 2

Races 
Class winners are marked in bold. 

Race 1 ResultRace 2 Result

Race 1 Result

Race 2 Result

References

Notes

External links
 

Road to Le Mans
Road to Le Mans